Biovičino Selo is a village located in the municipality of Kistanje, in the Šibenik-Knin County, Croatia.

History

Demographics
According to the 2011 census, the village of Biovičino Selo has a population of 223. This represents 25.52% of its pre-war population according to the 1991 census.

According to the 1991 census, 99.58% of the village population were ethnic Serbs (944/948).

Notable natives and residents

Gallery

References

External links
 

Populated places in Šibenik-Knin County